Asim Butt may refer to:
 Asim Butt (cricketer)
 Asim Butt (artist)